"A Pain That I'm Used To" is a song by English electronic band Depeche Mode. It is the opening track on their eleventh studio album, Playing the Angel (2005).

Background
Mute Records released "A Pain That I'm Used To" on 12 December 2005 as the album's second single. The single contains remixes by UK Mute label mates Goldfrapp, and Jacques Lu Cont (Stuart Price). There are also two radio versions. The first one is only a slight remix, whereas the second contains a completely different, more electronic introduction and instrumentation.

Although "Better Days" was mentioned to be the B-side for the single in its press release, it ended up being a track called "Newborn" when the track lists were released. "Better Days" went on to be the B-side to the following single, "Suffer Well". "Newborn" is a slow song that transforms into a harder song during the chorus. It is a fan-favourite in terms of B-sides.

The single was only physically released in the UK. The US only had a digital release (i.e., iTunes). The song reached number 15 upon UK release. In the US, the song debuted at number 45 on the Hot Dance Music/Club Play chart on 14 January 2006. It eventually reached number 6.

The track is one of the few Depeche Mode songs to feature a real bass, which is played by Andrew Fletcher.

Formats and track listings
7-inch: Picture disc / Bong36 (EU)
 "A Pain That I'm Used To (Goldfrapp remix)" – 4:39
 "Newborn (Foster Remix by Kettel)" – 5:26

12-inch: Mute / 12Bong36 (EU)
 "A Pain That I'm Used To (Jacques Lu Cont remix)" – 7:51
 "A Pain That I'm Used To (Jacques Lu Cont dub)" – 8:00

12-inch: Mute / L12Bong36 (EU)
 "A Pain That I'm Used To (Bitstream Threshold mix)" – 6:07
 "A Pain That I'm Used To (Bitstream Spansule mix)" – 7:21

CD: Mute / CDBong36 (EU)
 "A Pain That I'm Used To" – 4:11
 "Newborn" – 5:34

CD: Mute / LCDBong36 (EU)
 "A Pain That I'm Used To (Jacques Lu Cont remix)" – 7:51
 "A Pain That I'm Used To (Jacques Lu Cont dub)" – 8:00
 "A Pain That I'm Used To (Goldfrapp remix)" – 4:39
 "A Pain That I'm Used To (Bitstream Spansule mix)" – 7:22
 "A Pain That I'm Used To (Telex remix)" – 3:28

DVD: Mute / DVDBong36 (EU)
 "A Pain That I'm Used To (video)" – 3:49
 "A Pain That I'm Used To (exclusive behind the scenes footage)" – 3:52
 "Newborn (Foster Remix by Kettel)" – 5:26

Digital downloads
 "A Pain That I'm Used To (Telex club mix)" - 5.49
 "A Pain That I'm Used To (Telex remix 2)" - 3.26
 "A Pain That I'm Used To (Bitstream Spansule mix edit)" – 4:15
 "A Pain That I'm Used To (Bitstream Threshold mix edit)" – 4:04
 "A Pain That I'm Used To (Jacques Lu Cont remix edit)" – 4:47

Charts

References

External links
 Single information from the official Depeche Mode web site
 Allmusic review

2005 singles
Depeche Mode songs
Songs written by Martin Gore
Mute Records singles
2005 songs
Song recordings produced by Ben Hillier
Number-one singles in Poland
Number-one singles in Spain